Geert van Beijeren (Leeuwarden 20 November 1933 – Slootdorp 6 March 2005) was a Dutch gallerist at Art & Project, curator and art collectors in the Netherlands, known with Adriaan van Ravesteijn for their pioneering role in the field of conceptual art in the Netherlands.

Van Beijeren and Van Ravesteijn founded the leading Dutch art gallery Art & Project (1968–2001) and publishers of the art magazine of the same name (1968–1989). During its thirty-year existence, the gallery as well as the magazine made substantial contributions to the Dutch art climate.

Biography 
Van Beijer was born and raised in Leeuwarden. After his education he moved to Amsterdam were he began his career in the art world as a librarian at the Amsterdam Stedelijk Museum. From 1967 tot 1973 he was also associated with the periodical Kunst & Museumjournaal.

In 1968 Van Beijer and his friend and partner Adriaan van Ravesteijn started the Art & Project gallery. From 1971 until 1979 he was curator of painting and sculpture at the Stedelijk Museum. For that reason he temporarily withdrew from his job as co-administrator of the gallery.

At the Stedelijk Museum he organised solo exhibitions of Robert Ryman and Richard Long, both in 1973. From 1986 until 1988 he returned to the museum scene as head curator at the Museum Boijmans Van Beuningen in Rotterdam.

Further reading 
 Rini Dippel, 'Art & Project: The Early Years'. In: Christophe Cherix (ed.), In & Out of Amsterdam: Travels in Conceptual Art, 1960–1976, 2009, page 23-34 (online text partly available at Google Books)

References

External links 
 Van Ravesteijn in Slootdorp, 24 augustus 1997

1933 births
2005 deaths
Dutch art dealers
Dutch art collectors
Dutch art curators
People from Leeuwarden